The All-Big Ten Teams are composed of players at all positions from teams that are members of the Big Ten Conference, an NCAA Division I conference. Each year, beginning in 2013–14, at the conclusion of the Big Ten regular season a media panel and the head coaches of each member team vote for players to be placed on the all-conference teams. The all-Big Ten teams are a successor to the All-CCHA Teams which were discontinued after the conference dissolved due to the 2013–14 NCAA conference realignment.

The all-conference teams are composed of one goaltender, two defensemen and three forwards. Players may only appear once per year on any of the first or second teams but freshman may appear on both the rookie team and one of the other all-conference teams.

All-conference teams

First Team

2010s

2020s

First Team players by school

Multiple appearances

Second Team

2010s

2020s

Second Team players by school

Multiple appearances

Freshman Team

2010s

2020s

All-Freshman Team players by school

See also
Big Ten Awards
All-CCHA Teams
All-WCHA Teams

References

External links

College ice hockey trophies and awards in the United States